Príncipe de Gales is an underground metro station on the Line 4 of the Santiago Metro, in Santiago, Chile. South of this station, Line 4 runs under Américo Vespucio Avenue, which in this section takes the name of Ossa Avenue. The station was opened on 30 November 2005 as part of the inaugural section of the line between Tobalaba and Grecia.

References

Santiago Metro stations
Railway stations opened in 2005
Santiago Metro Line 4